Olga Jevrić (29 September 1922 – 10 February 2014) was a Serbian sculptor.

Biography
Olga Jevrić was born in Belgrade in 1922. In 1941 she graduated from high school, but initially failed the entrance exam to study in the Sculpture department of the Academy of Fine Arts. The following year, she successfully enrolled both in the Academy of Fine Arts, and the Academy of Music in Belgrade.

In 1948 Jevrić graduated from the sculpture department of AFA, in the class of Professor Sreten Stojanović. She got an M.A. degree in 1949 (special course) in the class of the aforementioned teacher. She also studied art history in Belgrade.

She was accepted as a member of Serbian Academy of Sciences and Arts (SASA) and SLUJ in 1950.

Her first exhibition was in 1948, and from that time on has been included in and the subject of many exhibitions both at home and abroad. She was the recipient of numerous honors.

Jevrić was the first new donor to the Belgrade Heritage House; she signed a Gift Contract on 10 February 2006 and bequeathed 47 of her sculptures made in iron-oxide, iron, cement, terracotta and filmed plaster.

Jevrić died on 10 February 2014 in Belgrade at the age of 91.

See also
 List of Serbian painters
 Ana Bešlić
 Marija Vuković

References

External links
  
 Biography at the Belgrade Heritage House

Serbian sculptors
Members of the Serbian Academy of Sciences and Arts
1922 births
2014 deaths
Serbian women sculptors
Yugoslav sculptors